Anna Veronica Helen Palm (born 1 February 1973) is a Swedish Social Democratic politician. She has been a Member of the Swedish Riksdag since 2002 and is chairman of the Stockholm Labour Commune since 2009.

She was married to Roger Mogert, the, then, opposition leader of Stockholm Municipality, with whom she has three children, Alva, Moa and Klara Mogert Palm. They announced their separation on 10 April 2013.

References

External links
Veronica Palm at the Riksdag website

Members of the Riksdag from the Social Democrats
Living people
1973 births
Women members of the Riksdag
Members of the Riksdag 2002–2006
21st-century Swedish women politicians